The 1937–38 William & Mary Indians men's basketball team represented the College of William & Mary in intercollegiate basketball during the 1937–38 season. Under the first year of head coach John Kellison, the team finished the season 2–10, 0–8 in Southern Conference play. This was the second straight season that the Indians' finished winless in the Southern Conference. This was the 33rd season of the collegiate basketball program at William & Mary, whose nickname is now the Tribe. The Indians finished 15th in the conference and did not quality for the 1938 Southern Conference men's basketball tournament in Raleigh, North Carolina.

Schedule

|-
!colspan=9 style="background:#006400; color:#FFD700;"| Regular season

Source

References

William & Mary Tribe men's basketball seasons
William and Mary Indians
William and Mary Indians Men's Basketball Team
William and Mary Indians Men's Basketball Team